Hodgkiss is a surname. Notable people with the surname include:

Amber Hodgkiss (born 1992), British actress
David Hodgkiss (1949–2020), British administrator and CEO
Ed Hodgkiss (born 1970), American football coach
Jared Hodgkiss (born 1986), English footballer
Mark Hodgkiss (born 1977), English cricketer